Sehr is a surname. Notable people with the surname include:

 Markus Sehr (born 1977), German film director
 Walter Sehr (1904–?), Austrian bobsledder

See also
 Sehr Mahmood, 2006 winner of Miss Pakistan World
 Sehr Bagla, village
 Sehra (disambiguation)